Kulathoor  is a village in Thiruvananthapuram district in the state of Kerala, India. It is the location of a Government Higher Secondary School.

Demographics
 India census, Kulathoor grama panchayat has a population of 32978 with 16489 males and 16489 females.

General Information 
District : Thiruvananthapuram 
Block‌ : Parassala 
Area : 11.24 km²  
Localbody Code : G011203 
 
No of Wards : 20

References

Villages in Thiruvananthapuram district